Dennis Malone Carter (c. 1820 - 1881) was an Irish-American painter. Carter's birth date is variously listed as 1818, 1820, and 1827. Born in Ireland, he immigrated to the United States with his parents in 1839. He settled in New York City, painting portraits and historical settings, where he died in July 1881. He is interred in Woodlawn Cemetery in The Bronx, New York City.

Artworks

References

External links
 

19th-century American painters
American male painters
Year of birth uncertain
1881 deaths
19th-century American male artists